Muza may refer to:

Places 
 Muza, Pomeranian Voivodeship, a village Poland
 Mawza District or Muza, a district of the Taiz Governorate, Yemen
 Muza Emporion, an ancient emporion on the Arabian coast of the Red Sea in modern Yemen
 MUŻA, an art museum in Valletta, Malta

Music 
 Polskie Nagrania Muza, a Polish record label
 "Muza" (song), by BQL, 2016
 Muza, an album by Martin Vučić, or the title song

People
 Muza Krepkogorskaya (1924–1999), Soviet and Russian actress
 Muza Niyazova (born 1938), former First Lady of Turkmenistan
 Mūza Rubackytė (born 1959), Lithuanian pianist

See also
 Muza Kawasaki Symphony Hall, a concert hall in Kawasaki, Kanagawa, Japan